Albert Harold Lyons (July 18, 1918 – December 20, 1965) was an American professional baseball player. He also appeared in five games as an outfielder and 16 more as a pinch hitter, compiling a .293 MLB career batting average (17 hits in 58 at bats), with one home run, three doubles, and nine runs batted in.

As a hurler in the Majors, Lyons worked in an even 100 innings pitched, allowing 125 hits and 59 bases on balls. He made one start and worked in 38 games in relief.

His pro career lasted for 16 seasons (1940–1944; 1946–1956), including a long stint in the top-level Pacific Coast League. However, in the minor leagues, Lyons was predominantly an outfielder, appearing in over 1,000 games in that role, compared to 134 as a pitcher.

After retiring from the field, Lyons became a scout, serving the New York Mets during their early years as an expansion team and signing Dick Selma, among others. He died at 47 in  Inglewood, California, from a heart attack.

References

External links

1918 births
1965 deaths
American expatriate baseball players in Canada
Baseball players from Los Angeles
Baseball players from Missouri
Binghamton Triplets players
Boston Braves players
Brandon Greys players
Hollywood Stars players
Joplin Miners players
Kansas City Blues (baseball) players
Major League Baseball pitchers
Milwaukee Brewers (minor league) players
Modesto Reds players
New York Mets scouts
New York Yankees players
Pittsburgh Pirates players
San Diego Padres (minor league) players
San Francisco Seals (baseball) players
Seattle Rainiers players
Williston Oilers players